Romain Noble (born 24 June 1980) is a French wheelchair fencer who competes in international fencing competitions. He is a Paralympic champion, four-time World champion and three-time European champion.

References

External links
 
 

1980 births
Living people
Sportspeople from Bordeaux
Paralympic wheelchair fencers of France
Wheelchair fencers at the 2012 Summer Paralympics
Wheelchair fencers at the 2016 Summer Paralympics
Wheelchair fencers at the 2020 Summer Paralympics
Medalists at the 2012 Summer Paralympics
Medalists at the 2016 Summer Paralympics
Medalists at the 2020 Summer Paralympics